Tréflévénez is a commune in the Finistère department of Brittany in north-western France.

Population
Inhabitants of Tréflévénez are called in French Tréflévénéziens.

See also
Communes of the Finistère department

References

External links

Official website
Mayors of Finistère Association 

Communes of Finistère